Saint-Hilaire-de-Dorset is a parish municipality in the Beauce-Sartigan Regional County Municipality in the Chaudière-Appalaches region of Quebec, Canada.

The municipality is named after Hilary of Poitiers and the county of Dorset in England.

Demographics 

References 

Commission de toponymie du Québec

Incorporated places in Chaudière-Appalaches
Parish municipalities in Quebec